Svitlana Mykolayivna Iaromka (born 9 April 1989) is a Ukrainian judoka. She is the 2016 European silver medalist in the +78 kg division. Iaromka repeated her success next year.

She also practises sumo and was a participant of the 2013 World Games where she won bronze in open event.

References

External links

 
 

1989 births
Living people
Ukrainian female judoka
European Games medalists in judo
European Games bronze medalists for Ukraine
Judoka at the 2015 European Games
Judoka at the 2016 Summer Olympics
Olympic judoka of Ukraine
People from Yahotyn
Universiade medalists in judo
World Games gold medalists
World Games bronze medalists
Competitors at the 2013 World Games
Competitors at the 2022 World Games
Universiade bronze medalists for Ukraine
Medalists at the 2009 Summer Universiade
Sportspeople from Kyiv Oblast
21st-century Ukrainian women